Lusaka West Secondary School was established in 2000, under the Republic of Zambia education Act.

The school opened its doors on 15 January 2007 with nine students. By the end of the year the number had grown to more than 60. The school has a capacity of 300 students.

Accreditation 
The school offers Examination Council of Zambia (ECZ) syllabus as well as IGCSE Cambridge examinations. It is accredited as an Examination Centre for the Local Examinations as well as Cambridge(External) Examinations.

Fraternity 
The school has 200 students, 21 teaching staff and over 30 support staff.

Curriculum

Grade 8 to 9 
The junior Secondary pupils follow the Examination Council of Zambia(ECZ) syllabus. Subjects offered are;
English, Mathematics, Environmental Science, Geography, History, Civics, Office Practice, Religious Education, French and Computers.

References 

Schools in Lusaka
Cambridge schools in Zambia
Secondary schools in Zambia